The 1993 Bausch & Lomb Championships was a women's tennis tournament played on outdoor clay courts at the Amelia Island Plantation on Amelia Island, Florida in the United States that was part of Tier II of the 1993 WTA Tour. It was the 14th edition of the tournament and was held from April 5 through April 11, 1993. Arantxa Sánchez Vicario won the singles title.

Finals

Singles
 Arantxa Sánchez Vicario defeated  Gabriela Sabatini 6–2, 5–7, 6–2
 It was Sánchez Vicario's 2nd title of the year and the 10th of her career.

Doubles
 Manuela Maleeva-Fragniere /  Leila Meskhi defeated  Amanda Coetzer /  Inés Gorrochategui 3–6, 6–3, 6–4
 It was Maleeva-Fragniere's 1st title of the year and the 4th of her career. It was Meskhi's 2nd title of the year and the 4th of her career.

External links
 ITF tournament edition details

Bausch and Lomb Championships
Amelia Island Championships
Bausch & Lomb Championships
Bausch & Lomb Championships
Bausch & Lomb Championships